Alexeevca is a commune in Floreşti District, Moldova. It is composed of four villages: Alexeevca, Chirilovca, Dumitreni and Rădulenii Noi.

References

Communes of Florești District